Charles-Dominique-Joseph Eisen (17 August 1720 – 4 January 1778) was a French painter and engraver.

Life 
The son and pupil of Frans Eisen, he was born at Valenciennes. In 1741 he went to Paris, and in the following year entered the studio of Le Bas. His talent and his sparkling wit gained him admission to the court, where he became painter and draftsman to the King, and drawing-master to Madame de Pompadour. He afterwards fell into disgrace, and in 1777 retired to Brussels, where he died in poverty in 1778.

His paintings are not without merit, but it is as a designer of illustrations and vignettes for books that he is best known. The most notable of these are the designs for the Fermiers généraux edition of the Contes of La Fontaine, published at Amsterdam in 1762; Ovid's Metamorphoses, 1767–71; the Henriade of Voltaire, 1770; the Baisers of Dorat, 1770; and the Vies des Peintres hollandais et flamands of Descamps, published in 1751–63. He etched a few plates of the Virgin, a St. Jerome, St. Ely preaching, etc. There are pictures by him in the Museums of Bordeaux, Alençon, and Bourg, and even at Nordnorsk Kunstmuseum in Tromsø, Norway.

Gallery

References 

 

1720 births
1778 deaths
18th-century French engravers
French illustrators
French erotic artists
Court painters
People from Valenciennes